"I Could Get Used to This" is a song by English singer Becky Hill and English DJ Weiss. The track was released by labels Polydor Records and Eko Records on 29 March 2019. The song was written by Hill, Mark Ralph, MNEK,  Michael Kintish and Ryan Ashley. The song was produced by Ralph and Weiss, with additional vocal production by Kintish and MNEK. The music video for the song was released alongside the single, and was directed by Michael Holyk. "I Could Get Used to This" achieved moderate success on the UK Singles Chart, having peaked at 45.

Credits and personnel
Credits adapted from Tidal.

 Becky Hill – lead vocals, composition
 Ryan Ashley – composition
 Matt Colton – mastering, studio personnel
 Ross Fortune – engineering, studio personnel
 Tom A.D. Fuller – engineering, studio personnel
 Michael Kintish – composition, vocal production
 MNEK – composition, vocal production
 Mark Ralph – music production, composition, mixing, post-production, studio personnel
 Weiss – music production, additional production

Charts

Certifications

References

External links
 

2019 songs
2019 singles
Becky Hill songs
Polydor Records singles
Songs written by Becky Hill
Songs written by MNEK
Songs written by Mark Ralph (record producer)
Song recordings produced by Mark Ralph (record producer)